The second season of Ghost Whisperer, an American television series created by John Gray, commenced airing in the United States on September 22, 2006, concluded May 11, 2007, and consisted of 22 episodes. The series follows the life of Melinda Gordon (Jennifer Love Hewitt), who has the ability to see and communicate with ghosts. While trying to live as normal a life as possible—she is married and owns an antique store—Melinda helps earthbound spirits resolve their problems and cross over into the Light, or the spirit world. Her tasks are difficult and at times she struggles with people who push her away and disbelieve her ability. In addition, the ghosts are mysterious and sometimes menacing in the beginning and Melinda must use the clues available to her to understand the spirit's needs and help them.

Ghost Whisperer'''s second season aired in the United States (U.S.) on Fridays at 8:00 pm ET on CBS, a terrestrial television network, where it received an average of 9.90 million viewers per episode.

 Plot 
In the second season, Melinda crosses over Andrea and meets Delia Banks (Camryn Manheim), her son Ned Banks (Tyler Patrick Jones; Christoph Sanders in later seasons), and Professor Rick Payne (Jay Mohr), all of whom, by season's end, come to learn of Melinda's ability, with varying reactions. Delia remains slightly skeptical. The second season revolves around the thinning veil between the living and the dead. Melinda meets Gabriel, who has similar abilities to hers. But Gabriel is working for the Shadows (as yet unnamed) and working to make sure that ghosts do not cross over into the light, and in fact is working to block the light from all ghosts.

At the end of the season, Melinda finds four children, each of whom have survived a different accident and have been prophecising about a tragedy. Melinda believes she has to protect these children and at the one-year memorial walk for the plane crash, she pushes the children out of the way of a collapsing monument, but is struck and killed by it herself. She sees the light, and a ghost appears and talks to her. The children resurrect Melinda (it was actually the children's job to protect her). When questioned by Jim, Melinda reveals that she believes the ghost was her father, Tom Gordon (played by Martin Donovan), and that he told her she has a brother.

 Development Ghost Whisperer is based on the work of "Spirit Communicator" James Van Praagh, who is co-executive producer and regularly updated a blog about the show through LivingTV. The stories are also said to be based in part on the work of "Spirit Communicator" Mary Ann Winkowski. Development of the show dates back to at least two years before its premiere.

The show was produced by Sander/Moses Productions in association with CBS Television Studios (originally Paramount Network Television in season one and ABC Studios (originally Touchstone Television in the first two seasons) and CBS Paramount Network Television in seasons two and three).

The show was filmed on the Universal Studios back lot in Los Angeles. One area on the lot is Courthouse Square from the Back to the Future trilogy, though it has been drastically modified to depict Grandview. For example, the clock tower in Back to the Future'' has been completely covered up. Cast and crew members believe that the set gets visits from real spirits.

Sound effects were completed at Smart Post Sound. Visual effects for the pilot and some season one episodes were completed at Flash Film Works. Visual effects for nearly the entire series were created at Eden FX.

Creator John Gray grew up in Brooklyn, New York, which is not far from Grandview-On-Hudson, west of the Hudson River. Piermont is often referenced in episodes as the neighboring town, which is accurate to real life as Grandview-On-Hudson is actually located just north of Piermont. Professor Rick Payne worked in the fictional "Rockland University," and perhaps not coincidentally, the actual Grandview, New York is a village located in Rockland County, New York.

Cast 

 Jennifer Love Hewitt as Melinda Gordon (22 episodes)
 David Conrad as Jim Clancy (22 episodes)
 Aisha Tyler as Andrea Marino (1 episode)
 Camryn Manheim as Delia Banks (21 episodes)

Episodes

References 

General references 
 
 
 

2006 American television seasons
2007 American television seasons
2